Fern Britton Meets... is a British television talk show presented by Fern Britton which was first aired on BBC One during the four Sundays of Advent from 29 November to 20 December 2009. Each episode featured Britton interviewing a high-profile person about their life, career and religious beliefs. The programme attracted particular attention following an interview with former British Prime Minister Tony Blair in which he discussed his thoughts about the 2003 invasion of Iraq.

Summary
Each episode features Britton interviewing a different personality, with the discussion focussed on how the individual's beliefs have shaped their lives. The programme was the first to be presented by Britton since leaving the ITV daytime show This Morning earlier in the year.

The series was announced in November 2009, and Britton said:
All the interviewees come from very different backgrounds but what binds them together is the fact that, although their faith has been challenged, they've emerged with strong spiritual beliefs.

Episodes

Series 1

Series 2

Series 3

Series 4

Series 5

Series 6

Series 7

Series 8

Series 9

Tony Blair interview

The series attracted particular attention for an interview Britton recorded with Tony Blair which was aired on Sunday 13 December 2009, in which the former Prime Minister said that it would have been right to remove Iraqi president Saddam Hussein even without evidence he had weapons of mass destruction. Asked whether he would still have joined the 2003 invasion of Iraq had he known that there were no weapons, he said: "I would still have thought it right to remove him. I mean obviously you would have had to use and deploy different arguments, about the nature of the threat." [...] "I can't really think we'd be better with him and his two sons still in charge, but it's incredibly difficult.." [...] "That's why I sympathise with the people who were against [the war] for perfectly good reasons and are against it now, but for me, you know, in the end I had to take the decision."

Responding to the statement, former United Nations weapons inspector Hans Blix said that he believed Blair's statement had a "strong impression of a lack of sincerity", while former Liberal Democrat leader Sir Menzies Campbell said that Blair would not have obtained the support for an invasion if he had been so open about his view on regime change at the time. Conservative MP Richard Ottaway, a member of the House of Commons Intelligence and Security Committee dismissed the comments as a "cynical ploy to soften up public opinion" before his appearance at the Iraq Inquiry.

Giving evidence to the inquiry on 29 January 2010 Blair addressed the interview, saying that it had been recorded in July 2009, some months before the inquiry convened, and he admitted that it had been a mistake to say he would have got rid of Saddam Hussein regardless of whether or not he had WMD. He told the inquiry he "did not use the words regime change in that interview", and that what he had meant was that he "couldn't describe the nature of the threat in the same way if you knew then what you know now". Blair's performance was later condemned by families of military personnel killed in Iraq as disrespectful.

References

External links

2009 British television series debuts
2000s British television talk shows
2010s British television talk shows
BBC high definition shows
BBC Television shows
BBC television talk shows
Christian television
British religious television series
English-language television shows